40463 Frankkameny, provisional designation , is a carbonaceous background asteroid from the central region of the asteroid belt, approximately 4 kilometers in diameter. It was discovered on 15 September 1999, by Canadian amateur astronomer Gary Billings at Calgary Observatory  in Alberta, Canada. The asteroid was named after American activist Frank Kameny.

Orbit and classification 

Frankkameny is a non-family from the main belt's background population. It orbits the Sun in the central asteroid belt at a distance of 2.3–3.3 AU once every 4 years and 8 months (1,692 days). Its orbit has an eccentricity of 0.18 and an inclination of 2° with respect to the ecliptic.

Physical characteristics 

Frankkameny has been characterized as a carbonaceous C-type asteroid by Pan-STARRS photometric survey.

Rotation period 

It has a rotation period of 56.6 hours with a brightness variation of 0.51 magnitude, based on a lightcurve obtained in September 2013, from photometric observations made at the Palomar Transient Factory, California. While not being a slow rotator, Frankkamenys period is far longer than average, and its brightness amplitude is indicative of a non-spheroidal shape.

Diameter and albedo 

According to the survey carried out by NASA's Wide-field Infrared Survey Explorer with its subsequent NEOWISE mission, Frankkameny measures 3.9 kilometers in diameter and its surface has an albedo of 0.075, while the Collaborative Asteroid Lightcurve Link assumes a standard albedo for carbonaceous asteroids of 0.057 and calculates a diameter of 4.2 kilometers.

Naming 

This minor planet was named in honour of American astronomer and gay rights activist Frank Kameny (1925–2011), by the Minor Planet Center and the International Astronomical Union on 3 July 2012. Frank Kameny was a Harvard-trained variable star astronomer. He died 11 October 2011. The approved naming citation was published by the Minor Planet Center on 3 July 2012.

References

External links 
 Asteroid Lightcurve Database (LCDB), query form (info )
 Dictionary of Minor Planet Names, Google books
 Asteroids and comets rotation curves, CdR – Observatoire de Genève, Raoul Behrend
 Discovery Circumstances: Numbered Minor Planets (1)-(5000) – Minor Planet Center
 
 

040463
Discoveries by Gary W. Billings
Named minor planets
19990915